Juan Giraldo (born 25 August 1974) is a Colombian wrestler. He competed in the men's Greco-Roman 100 kg at the 1996 Summer Olympics. Juan Diego Giraldo had the following finishes at major championships – 1991 Pan-American Games: 90.0 kg. Greco-Roman (4th); 1991 Pan-American Games: 90.0 kg. Freestyle (5th); 1990 Central American Championship: 90.0 kg. Greco-Roman (2nd).

References

External links
 

1974 births
Living people
Colombian male sport wrestlers
Olympic wrestlers of Colombia
Wrestlers at the 1996 Summer Olympics
Place of birth missing (living people)
20th-century Colombian people